Robert Katz (27 June 1933 – 20 October 2010) was an American novelist, screenwriter, and non-fiction author.

Biography

Katz was born in Brooklyn, New York, the son of Sidney and Helen Katz, née Holland, and married Beverly Gerstel on September 22, 1957. The couple had two sons: Stephen Lee Katz and Jonathan Howard Katz.

He studied at Brooklyn College 1951–53 and went on to be a photojournalist and writer at the United Hias Service, NYC 1953–57; at the American Cancer Society in New York (1958–63); and then at the United Nations in New York and Rome (1963–64). He was a freelance writer from 1964 until his death.

He fulfilled academic roles at numerous institutions, including being visiting professor of Investigative Journalism at the University of California, Santa Cruz (1986–92). Awarded an ongoing Guggenheim Fellowship in 1970, he had also been a fellow of Adlai E. Stevenson College, University of California during 1986 to 1992. He became a grantee of the American Council of Learned Societies in 1971 and a recipient of the Laceno d'Oro (best screenplay) award at the Neorealist Film Festival in Avellino, Italy (1983).

Katz was involved in a criminal-libel lawsuit in Italy over the contents of his book Death in Rome, in which he was charged with "defaming the memory of the Pope" Pius XII regarding the Ardeatine Massacre of 335 Italians, including 70 Jews, at the Ardeatine Caves in 1944. The book aroused international religious and political controversy; the book was made into the 1973 film Massacre in Rome starring Richard Burton. which brought the controversy to court, culminating in a two-year criminal trial. Katz was ultimately convicted and sentenced to fourteen months in prison for defaming the memory of Pope Pius XII.  The verdict was overturned on appeal and later the case was dismissed by Italy's Supreme Court.

Katz lived for many years in Tuscany, Italy. He died October 20, 2010, in Montevarchi, Italy, as a result of complications from cancer surgery.

Non-fiction writings
Death in Rome, New York: Macmillan Publishers, 1967.
Black Sabbath: A Journey through a Crime against Humanity, Macmillan, 1969.
The Fall of the House of Savoy, Macmillan, 1971.
A Giant in the Earth, Stein & Day, 1973.
Days of Wrath: The Ordeal of Aldo Moro, the Kidnapping, the Execution, the Aftermath, Doubleday, 1980. (Pulitzer Prize nomination 1981)
Il caso Moro (with G. Ferrara and A. Balducci), Pironti, 1987.
Love is Colder than Death: The Life and Times of Rainer Werner Fassbinder, Random House, 1987.
Naked by the Window: The Fatal Marriage of Carl Andre and Ana Mendieta, Atlantic Monthly Press, 1990.
Dossier Priebke, Rizzoli, 1997.
The Battle for Rome: the Germans, the Allies, the Partisans and the Pope, September 1943-June 1944, Simon & Schuster, 2003.

Novels

The Cassandra Crossing, Ballantine, 1976.
Ziggurat, Houghton, 1977.
The Spoils of Ararat, Houghton, 1978.

Filmography
Massacre in Rome (1973) (book "Death in Rome") (screenplay)
The Cassandra Crossing (1976) (screenplay) (story)
The Salamander (1981) (writer)
La pelle (1981) (screenplay)
Kamikaze 1989 (1982) (writer)
Dolce e selvaggio (1983) (English dialogue)
Il Caso Moro (1986) (book Days of Wrath) (screenplay)
Il cugino americano (1986) (story)
Hotel Colonial (1987) (writer)
The Telephone (1988) (producer)
The Plague (1992) (narration)
The Contractor (2007) (V) (story)

References

External links
Robert Katz's View of Modern Italy

1933 births
2010 deaths
20th-century American novelists
21st-century American non-fiction writers
American male screenwriters
Writers from Brooklyn
American male novelists
20th-century American male writers
Novelists from New York (state)
20th-century American non-fiction writers
American male non-fiction writers
Screenwriters from New York (state)
Brooklyn College alumni
21st-century American male writers